Rubens Pinheiro (born 12 October 1989 in São Paulo) is a Brazilian footballer who most recently played as a midfielder for the Fort Lauderdale Strikers in the North American Soccer League.

Career

Early career
Pinheiro started his footballing career at the youth Academy of Sport Club Corinthians Paulista in 2004 where he stayed till 2006 when he joined Benespa in 2007. He then went on to create a career at the lower levels of the Brazilian footballing pyramid with Grêmio Esportivo Osasco, Red Bull Brasil, and most recently Operário Futebol Clube (MS).

Fort Lauderdale Strikers
On 21 March 2013 it was officially announced that Pinheiro had signed with the Fort Lauderdale Strikers of the North American Soccer League. On 6 April 2013 Pinheiro made his debut for the Strikers against FC Edmonton in which he started and played 65 minutes as the strikers drew the match 1–1.

Career statistics

Club
Statistics accurate as of 7 April 2013

References

External links 
 Fort Lauderdale Strikers Profile.

1989 births
Living people
Brazilian footballers
Brazilian expatriate footballers
Operário Futebol Clube (MS) players
Fort Lauderdale Strikers players
Association football midfielders
Footballers from São Paulo
Expatriate soccer players in the United States
North American Soccer League players